Eupithecia salubris is a moth in the family Geometridae. It is found in western China (the mountains of Shanxi and Shaanxi).

The wingspan is about 14–16 mm. The fore- and hindwings are uniform pale brown.

References

Moths described in 2004
salubris
Moths of Asia